The 2000–01 Tetley's Bitter Rugby Union County Championship was the 101st edition of England's County Championship rugby union club competition.

Yorkshire won their 14th title by defeating Cornwall in the final. 

The competition had been devastated by the cancelling of fixtures due to flooding in 2000 and a foot-and-mouth disease outbreak in 2001, so therefore the two previous years' winners Yorkshire and Cornwall met in a challenge match to decide the Championship.

Final

See also
 English rugby union system
 Rugby union in England

References

Rugby Union County Championship
County Championship (rugby union) seasons